James Murray (born 14 March 1884) was an Irish footballer who played for, among others, Sheffield Wednesday.

Murray spent part of his early life living in Glasgow, where he played at the Junior level with Shettleston. When he went back to Ireland, he had success with Distillery, winning the Irish Cup in 1905 and the Irish League the following year, as well as being selected for its representative team. He returned to Scotland and continued playing for Shettleston until 1909 when he was given an opportunity at senior level by Motherwell who were looking to reinforce their forward line following the departure of Jimmy Stewart who had joined Liverpool.

Murray made a quick impact at Fir Park, scoring at the rate of almost a goal per game in the Scottish Football League Division One; in early 1910 this form earned him selection for Ireland for the British Home Championship, in the process becoming Motherwell's first international player. He soon signed for The Wednesday, with the Sheffield club also recruiting teammate George Robertson, a winger credited with providing many of the opportunities from which Murray had scored (and who had gained his and Motherwell's first Scotland cap in the same period). However, while Robertson settled at Wednesday and remained with the Owls for several years, Murray did not secure a regular place and moved back to Ireland by 1911, turning out for Derry Celtic where he had also played before joining Distillery. He had another short spell with Motherwell, but this time made no impression and is not recorded as having made any first-team appearances in the two major competitions.

Honours
Distillery
 Irish League: 1905–06
 Irish Cup: 1904–05

References

1884 births
Irish association footballers (before 1923)
Pre-1950 IFA international footballers
Association football forwards
Lisburn Distillery F.C. players
Motherwell F.C. players
Glasgow United F.C. players
Derry Celtic F.C. players
Sheffield Wednesday F.C. players
Scottish Football League players
English Football League players
Scottish Junior Football Association players
NIFL Premiership players
Irish League representative players
Association footballers from County Donegal
Year of death missing